Jeff "Flash" Malcolm (born 9 May 1956 in Cowra, New South Wales), is an Australian professional boxer who fought from 1971 until 2002. He won the Australian light welterweight title, New South Wales (Australia) State lightweight title, Australasian light welterweight title, South Pacific light welterweight title, Queensland (Australia) State welterweight title, International Boxing Council (IBC) welterweight title, South Pacific welterweight title, World Boxing Federation (WBF) Intercontinental welterweight title, WBF welterweight title, Pan Asian Boxing Association (PABA) welterweight title, World Boxing Association (WBA) Fedelatin welterweight title, PABA light middleweight title, and Commonwealth light welterweight title. He was also a challenger for the South Seas light welterweight title against Pat Leglise, Australian welterweight title against Wilf Gentzen, and World Boxing Organization (WBO) welterweight title against Manning Galloway. He was inducted into the Australian National Boxing Hall of Fame in 2007.

Professional boxing record

References

External links

1963 births
Light-middleweight boxers
Lightweight boxers
Light-welterweight boxers
Living people
Middleweight boxers
People from Cowra
Super-middleweight boxers
Welterweight boxers
Australian male boxers
Commonwealth Boxing Council champions
Sportsmen from New South Wales